Bärbel Struppert ( Schrickel, (born 26 September 1950 in Jena) is a retired East German sprinter who specialised in the 100 metres.

She became European junior champion in 4 × 100 metres relay in 1966. At the 1972 Summer Olympics in Munich she won a silver medal in the 4 × 100 metres relay with her teammates Christina Heinich, Bärbel Struppert and the 100 and 200 m champion Renate Stecher.

She competed for the club SC Motor Jena during her active career. She married the DDR-Oberliga footballer Gerd Struppert.

References

1950 births
Living people
East German female sprinters
Athletes (track and field) at the 1972 Summer Olympics
Olympic athletes of East Germany
Olympic silver medalists for East Germany
Medalists at the 1972 Summer Olympics
Olympic silver medalists in athletics (track and field)
Olympic female sprinters
Sportspeople from Jena
Universiade medalists in athletics (track and field)
Universiade bronze medalists for East Germany